Gartnait son of Donuel ( or ; died 663) was king of the Picts from 657 until 663.

He succeeded Talorgan mac Enfret on the latter's death in 657. The Pictish Chronicle king lists give him a reign of six or six and a half years, corresponding with the notice of his death in the Annals of Ulster and the Annals of Tigernach in 663.

The king lists record that he was succeeded by his brother Drest VI.

References
 Anderson, Alan Orr, Early Sources of Scottish History A.D 500–1286, volume 1. Reprinted with corrections. Paul Watkins, Stamford, 1990.

External links
CELT: Corpus of Electronic Texts at University College Cork includes the Annals of Ulster, Tigernach, the Four Masters and Innisfallen, the Chronicon Scotorum, the Lebor Bretnach (which includes the Duan Albanach), Genealogies, and various Saints' Lives. Most are translated into English, or translations are in progress.
Pictish Chronicle 

7th-century births
663 deaths
Pictish monarchs
7th-century Scottish monarchs